Trichosanthes cucumerina is a tropical or subtropical vine. Its variety T. cucumerina var. anguina raised for its strikingly long fruit. In Asia, it is eaten immature as a vegetable much like the summer squash and in Africa, the reddish pulp of mature snake gourd is used as an economical substitute for tomato. Common names for the cultivated variety include snake gourd, serpent gourd, chichinda and padwal.

Trichosanthes cucumerina is found in the wild across much of South and Southeast Asia, including India, Bangladesh, Nepal, Pakistan, Sri Lanka, Indonesia, Malaysia, Myanmar(Burma) and southern China (Guangxi and Yunnan). It is also regarded as native in northern Australia. and naturalized in Florida, parts of Africa and on various islands in the Indian and Pacific Oceans.

Formerly, the cultivated form was considered a distinct species, T. anguina, but it is now generally regarded as conspecific with the wild populations, as they freely interbreed:

 Trichosanthes cucumerina var. anguina (L.) Haines – cultivated variant
 Trichosanthes cucumerina var. cucumerina – wild variant

Description

Trichosanthes cucumerina is a monoecious annual vine climbing by means of tendrils. Leaves are palmately lobed, up to 25 cm long. Flowers are unisexual, white, opening at night, with long branching hairs on the margins of the petals. These hairs are curled up in the daytime when the flower is closed, but unfurl at night to form a delicate lacy display (see photos in gallery below). Fruits can be up to 200 cm long, deep red at maturity, hanging below the vine.

The related Japanese snake gourd (Trichosanthes pilosa, sometimes called T. ovigera or T. cucumeroides), very similar in vegetative morphology, but the fruit of T. pilosa is round to egg-shaped, only about 7 cm long.

Uses
The common name "snake gourd" refers to the narrow, twisted, elongated fruit. It is soft, bland, somewhat mucilaginous flesh is similar to that of the luffa and the calabash. It is popular in the cuisines of South Asia and Southeast Asia and is now grown in some home gardens in Africa. With some cultivars, the immature fruit has an unpleasant odor and a slightly bitter taste, both of which disappear in cooking. The fruit becomes too bitter to eat as it reaches maturity, but it does contain a reddish pulp that is used in Africa as a substitute for tomatoes.
The shoots, tendrils and leaves are also eaten as greens.

Gallery

See also

 Trichosanthes kirilowii, Chinese snake gourd
 Trichosanthes ovigera, Japanese snake gourd
 Lagenaria siceraria, some of its immature edible cultivars can be found as "snake gourds", not the preferred name.
 Trichosanthes dioica, Pointed gourd or Parwal, also edible when immature.

Notes

References

External links

 Trichosanthes cucumerina Linn. improves glucose tolerance and tissue glycogen in non insulin dependent diabetes mellitus induced rats

cucumerina
Fruit vegetables
Plants described in 1753
Taxa named by Carl Linnaeus
Flora of the Indian subcontinent
Flora of Myanmar
Flora of Malesia
Flora of China
Flora of Yunnan
Flora of Guangxi
Flora of Africa
Rosids of Western Australia
Flora of the Northern Territory
Edible plants